Jane Ann Restani (born February 27, 1948 in San Francisco, California) is a senior United States Judge of the United States Court of International Trade. She was appointed to the Court on November 16, 1983 by President Ronald Reagan. She served as Chief Judge of the Court from 2003 to 2010.

Early life and education

Born in San Francisco, California, Restani graduated first in her class in 1966 from Mercy High School, in San Francisco. She received a Bachelor of Arts degree in 1969 in political science, cum laude, from the University of California, Berkeley, where she was a member of the Tower and Flame Honor Society. She received teaching credentials in 1970 from the University of California, Berkeley. In 1973, she received her Juris Doctor (fifth in her class) at the University of California, Davis School of Law. She was a law review staff writer in her second year, and articles editor in her third. She was a member of the Order of the Coif and Phi Kappa Phi.

Department of Justice career

She was admitted to practice law in California in 1973 and began her legal career in the Civil Division of the Justice Department, where she served as a trial attorney from 1973 to 1976. She served as assistant chief of the Commercial Litigation Branch of the Civil Division from 1976 to 1980. She served as Director of the Commercial Litigation Branch of the Civil Division from 1980 to 1983.

Trade Court service

On November 3, 1983, President Reagan nominated Restani to serve as a Judge of the United States Court of International Trade, to the seat vacated by Judge Herbert N. Maletz. She was confirmed by the United States Senate on November 15, 1983 and received her commission the following day. She assumed senior status on March 1, 2015.

Views on Wikipedia

In the case BP Products North America v. US, Court No. 06-00184, Restani wrote, "Based on the ability of any user to alter Wikipedia, the court is skeptical of it as a consistently reliable source of information. At this time, therefore, the court does not accept Wikipedia for the purposes of judicial notice."

Professional Honors and Activities

Member, Bankruptcy-Consumer and Commercial Subcommittee of the Corporation, Banking and Business Law Committee of the American Bar Association
Senior Executive Service Outstanding Performance Rating, September 1981
Civil Division Performance Award, May 1980
Meritorious Award, December 1979
Outstanding Performance Rating, March 1979
Department of Justice Special Achievement Award, October 1976
Attorney General's Special Commendation, December 1975
Guest Lecturer on Debtor-Creditor Law, Antioch School of Law
Author, "Bankruptcy," Civil Division Practice Manual

References

Sources
 

 Reproduced in Biography Resource Center. Farmington Hills, Michigan. Gale, 2008.

External links
 Senior Judge Jane A. Restani Biography on U.S. Court of International Trade website

1948 births
Living people
American people of Italian descent
California Republicans
Judges of the United States Court of International Trade
Lawyers from San Francisco
University of California, Berkeley alumni
UC Davis School of Law alumni
20th-century American judges
Critics of Wikipedia
20th-century American women judges
21st-century American women
United States federal judges appointed by Ronald Reagan